Faridah ( born c. 830) was an ‘Abbasid qayna (enslaved singing-girl), who performed in the court of caliph Al-Wathiq (r. 842–847) and Al-Mutawakkil (r. 847–861).

Originally a singing-girl belonging to the musician Amr ibn Bana, Farida was presented as a gift to Al-Wathiq. She studied with Shāriyah, and achieved prominence at the courts of both Al-Wathiq and his successor Al-Mutawakkil. An admirer of Ishaq al-Mawsili, she defended his reputation when it was attacked.

Al-Mutawakkil's only wife was Faridah. She belonged to the household of his brother Caliph al-Wathiq, who kept her as a concubine and favorite although she belonged to the singer Amr ibn Banah. When al-Wathiq died, Amr presented her to al-Mutawakkil. He married her, and she became one of his favorites.

References

Sources
 

830 births
Year of death uncertain
Year of death unknown
9th-century women musicians
Concubines of the Abbasid caliphs
Slaves from the Abbasid Caliphate
Singers of the medieval Islamic world
Medieval Arabic singers